The NYSE Arca Major Market Index (or XMI or MMI), previously the AMEX Major Market Index, is the American price-weighted stock market index made up of 20 Blue Chip industrial stocks of major U.S. corporations.  Several of the stocks are also components of the Dow Jones Industrial Average (DJIA).

Despite the name none of the stocks that make up the index trade on NYSE Arca exchange, instead all but one (Microsoft Corporation) trade on the NYSE. The index was established April 29, 1983; the base price on that date was set at 200.00 with a base value of 200.00

Futures on the XMI Index are traded on the Chicago Board of Trade. Options on the index are traded on Amex, and on Euronext.

XMI components

External links
 Index homepage
MAJOR MARKET INDEX Summary
Reuters page for .XMI

Notes

American stock market indices